Donald Earl "Slick" Watts (born July 22, 1951) is an American former basketball player. He is perhaps most well known for being the first NBA player to lead the league in both assists and steals, in 1976.

College
"Slick" Watts originally attended Grand View Junior College but transferred to Xavier University of Louisiana in 1970, where he would play college basketball for three years under coach Bob Hopkins, and alongside his teammate, future ABA and NBA star Bruce Seals.

For the 1972 season, Watts and Seals would lead the Gold Rush to its first NAIA District 30 Men's Basketball championship defeating Nicholls State University 85-83, but would go on to lose to Westmont in the 1972 NAIA men's basketball tournament semi-finals 71-59.

During his final season, Watts lead the Gold Rush to their second consecutive NAIA District 30 Championship, defeating Dillard University 101-80. In the 1973 NAIA men's basketball tournament Watts and his teammates would upset Sam Houston State University, 67-60, in the second round. At the time, the Bearkats were ranked first in the country in all college division polls and had gone 34 games, over a two-year period, without a loss. The Xavier Gold Rush would eventually lose in the semi-finals to Maryland-Eastern Shore 87-80.

NBA
Watts was not selected by any team in the 1973 NBA draft, but his former coach at Xavier University, Bob Hopkins, was a cousin of Bill Russell, who was the coach and general manager for the Seattle SuperSonics. Russell gave Watts a tryout and is noted for saying that, "Watts was the best-looking guard in camp and oftentimes embarrassed the other players." Watts signed with the SuperSonics as a rookie free agent.

After making the roster for the 1973–74 season as a reserve, he played more frequently the following season. On February 21, 1975, Watts recorded his first career triple-double with 12 points, 10 rebounds, and 11 assists, along with adding 4 steals, in a 110-108 win over the Atlanta Hawks. Two days later, Watts recorded a career-high 9 steals, while also scoring 13 points and adding 14 assists, during a 114-10 loss to the Philadelphia 76ers.  He became a starter for the 1975–76 season. That season, he led the NBA in total assists, assists per game, total steals, steals per game, and made NBA All-Defense First-Team. He was the first player to lead the NBA in assists and steals in the same season.

In 1976, Watts also received the J. Walter Kennedy Citizenship Award for his outstanding service to the community.  Watts followed with another productive year in the 1976-77 season, averaging 8.0 assists and 2.7 steals per game.

At the start of the 1977-78 season, Watts was re-united with Hopkins, who was hired as the Sonics' new head coach.  Hopkins was fired after a 5-17 start, and new coach Lenny Wilkens made some lineup changes, one of which was to replace Watts with Dennis Johnson.  Watts was eventually traded mid-season to the New Orleans Jazz for a first-round draft pick.

Watts retired from the league after the 1978-79 season due to injury. He played  years with the Sonics, half a season with the New Orleans Jazz, and one season with the Houston Rockets.

He picked up the nickname "Slick" because he was one of the first players to shave his head, unusual at the time. He was also known for wearing his headband off-center.  Despite a somewhat short tenure on the SuperSonics, Watts is viewed as one of Seattle’s more recognizable figures across sports.

Later years
After his playing career, Watts became a physical education teacher at Dearborn Park elementary school and a basketball coach at Franklin High School in the Seattle area and took up tennis. In 2001, Watts spent 22 days in a hospital with sarcoidosis, which caused his weight to drop by almost 50 pounds before his condition improved. He ended his post-basketball career teaching physical education for nearly 20 years at Martin Luther King, Jr. Elementary in Seattle before retiring in 2017.  In April 2021, three months before his 70th birthday, Watts suffered a major stroke.

Popular culture references
Watts is one of five 1970s Seattle SuperSonics players whose names are featured on characters in "The Exterminator," the third episode of Season 1 of iZombie. The other four are Freddie Brown, Gus Williams, Wally Walker and Marvin Webster.

NBA career statistics

Regular season

|-
| style="text-align:left;"|
| style="text-align:left;"|Seattle
| 62 || – || 23.0 || .388 || – || .645 || 2.9 || 5.7 || 1.9 || 0.2 || 8.0
|-
| style="text-align:left;"| 
| style="text-align:left;"|Seattle
| 82 || – || 25.1 || .421 || – || .608 || 3.2 || 6.1 || 2.3 || 0.1 || 6.8
|-
| style="text-align:left;"| 
| style="text-align:left;"|Seattle
| 82 || – || 33.9 || .427 || – || .578 || 4.5 ||style="background:#cfecec;"| 8.1* ||style="background:#cfecec;"| 3.2* || 0.2 || 13.0
|-
| style="text-align:left;"| 
| style="text-align:left;"|Seattle
| 79 || – || 33.3 || .422 || – || .587 || 3.9 || 8.0 || 2.7 || 0.3 || 13.0
|-
| style="text-align:left;"| 
| style="text-align:left;"|Seattle
| 32 || – || 25.3 || .404 || – || .566 || 2.5 || 4.2 || 1.7 || 0.4 || 7.8
|-
| style="text-align:left;"| 
| style="text-align:left;"|New Orleans
| 39 || – || 19.9 || .381 || – || .602 || 2.5 || 4.1 || 1.4 || 0.4 || 7.2
|-
| style="text-align:left;"| 
| style="text-align:left;"|Houston
| 61 || – || 17.1 || .405 || – || .612 || 1.7 || 4.0 || 1.2 || 0.2 || 3.7
|- class="sortbottom"
| style="text-align:center;" colspan="2"| Career
| 437 || – || 26.3 || .413 || – || .597 || 3.2 || 6.1 || 2.2 || 0.3 || 8.9

Playoffs

|-
|style="text-align:left;"|1975
|stye="text-align:left;"|Seattle
|9||–||31.3||.462||–||.538||3.7||7.1||3.0||0.4||11.1
|-
|style="text-align:left;"|1976
|stye="text-align:left;"|Seattle
|6||–||32.8||.435||–||.478||3.0||8.2||2.0||0.3||11.8
|-
|style="text-align:left;"|1979
|stye="text-align:left;"|Houston
|2||–||21.5||.400||–||.667||3.5||3.5||2.0||0.5||7.0
|- class="sortbottom"
| style="text-align:center;" colspan="2"| Career
| 17 || – || 30.7 || .446 || – || .519 || 3.4 || 7.1 || 2.5 || 0.4 || 10.9

See also
 List of National Basketball Association players with most steals in a game

References

External links
 

1951 births
Living people
20th-century African-American sportspeople
21st-century African-American people
African-American basketball players
American men's basketball players
Basketball players from Mississippi
Grand View Vikings men's basketball players
Houston Rockets players
New Orleans Jazz players
People from Rolling Fork, Mississippi
Point guards
Seattle SuperSonics players
Street basketball players
Undrafted National Basketball Association players
Xavier Gold Rush basketball players